La Piazza is an Italian folk music group that records and performs arrangements considered to be of traditional Latium inspiration. They have released two albums on the Waterfront Records label. They originally started as a quartet, but added three new musicians for their second album.

Band members
Daniele Conversa, guitar, bandola, vocals
Antonella Giallatini, percussion, vocals
Riccardo Masi, melodeon, vocals
Gabriele Modignliani, guitar, vocals
Sara Modigliani, guitar, vocals
Claudia Mortali, voice
Giuseppe Pontuali, melodeon

Discography
1997 - Amore piccolino fatte grande... (Small love, great deeds...)
2000 - Milandè (Midland)

Italian musical groups